The 6th constituency of Val-de-Marne is a French legislative constituency in the Val-de-Marne département.

Description

The 6th constituency of Val-de-Marne is a wedge of territory between the Bois de Vincennes to the south and Seine-Saint-Denis to the north forming part of the eastern suburbs of Paris.

The seat returned conservatives at every election from 1988 onwards, however at the 2012 the seat was captured by Laurence Abeille of the Greens.

Historic Representation

Election results

2022

 
 
 
 
 
 
 
|-
| colspan="8" bgcolor="#E9E9E9"|
|-

2017

 
 
 
 
 
 
|-
| colspan="8" bgcolor="#E9E9E9"|
|-

2012

 
 
 
 
 
 
|-
| colspan="8" bgcolor="#E9E9E9"|
|-

2007

 
 
 
 
 
 
 
|-
| colspan="8" bgcolor="#E9E9E9"|
|-

2002

 
 
 
 
 
|-
| colspan="8" bgcolor="#E9E9E9"|
|-

1997

 
 
 
 
 
 
 
 
|-
| colspan="8" bgcolor="#E9E9E9"|
|-

Sources
Official results of French elections from 2002: "Résultats électoraux officiels en France" (in French).

6